Tulireki is a roller coaster located at Linnanmäki in Helsinki, Finland.  It is Kalevala featured, just like Salama.

External links
On-ride video

Roller coasters in Finland
Linnanmäki
Roller coasters introduced in 2004